LG4 or variation, may refer to:

 La Grande-4 generating station (LG-4), Quebec, Canada
 Chevrolet LG4, a Chevrolet small-block engine
 Laminin G domain 4 (LG4)
 Lower Group 4, of the Bushveld Igneous Complex
 Kalah metro station (station code LG04) on the Wanda–Zhonghe–Shulin line in Taipei, Taiwan
 Bauskas District (LG04), Latvia; see List of FIPS region codes (J–L)

See also

 LG (disambiguation)
 4LG
 IG4
 1g4
 1.g4